Charles Sullivan may refer to:
Charles Sullivan (musician) (born 1944), American jazz trumpeter
Charles Sullivan (actor) (1899–1972), American actor
Charles Craven Sullivan (1807–1860), American politician from Pennsylvania
Charles F. Sullivan (1904–1962), Lieutenant Governor for the Commonwealth of Massachusetts, 1949–1953
Charles L. Sullivan (1924–1979), Lieutenant Governor of Mississippi, 1968–1972, general in the U.S. Air National Guard

See also
Charlie Sullivan (disambiguation)